Zarour or Zarou is a surname. Notable people with the surname include:

Chaher Zarour (born 1983), French footballer
Jeannette Zarou (born 1942), Palestinian-born Canadian soprano
Richard Zarou (born 1981), American music composer 
Wanees Zarour (born 1986), American musician